Carboxydothermus pertinax is a thermophilic and anaerobic bacterium from the genus of Carboxydothermus which has been isolated from a hot spring on the Kyushu Island in Japan.

References

 

Peptococcaceae
Bacteria described in 2012
Thermophiles